Zigzag Swamp, is a swamp located in Sussex County, in the U.S. state of Delaware.

References

Landforms of Sussex County, Delaware
Swamps of Delaware